Baron Hemingford, of Watford in the County of Hertford, is a title in the Peerage of the United Kingdom. It was created 1 February 1943 for the Conservative politician Sir Dennis Herbert. He was a Deputy Speaker of the House of Commons from 1931 to 1943. His son, the second Baron, notably served as Lord Lieutenant of Huntingdon and Peterborough from 1968 to 1974. The title is currently held by Christopher Herbert, who succeeded in 2022.

Barons Hemingford (1943)
 Dennis Henry Herbert, 1st Baron Hemingford (1869–1947)
 Dennis George Ruddock Herbert, 2nd Baron Hemingford (1904–1982)
 (Dennis) Nicholas Herbert Herbert, 3rd Baron Hemingford (1934–2022)
 Christopher Dennis Charles Herbert, 4th Baron Hemingford (b. 1973)

The heir apparent is the present holders son, Hon. Frederick Russell Dennis Herbert (b. 2011).

Notes

References
Kidd, Charles, Williamson, David (editors). Debrett's Peerage and Baronetage (1990 edition). New York: St Martin's Press, 1990, 

Baronies in the Peerage of the United Kingdom
Noble titles created in 1943